The Paleontological Society Medal is an award given by the Paleontological Society to a person whose eminence is based on advancement of knowledge in paleontology.

Awardees 
Source: Paleontological Society

See also
 List of paleontology awards

References 

Paleontology in the United States
Paleontology awards
American awards
Awards established in 1963
Paleontological Society